A tsuitate (衝立) is a form of single-panel portable partition traditionally used in Japan since at least the 6th century. They may be made of wood, or a wood frame covered in paper or silk cloth. The panels are often illustrated, with paintings on both sides, sometimes by well-known artists. The wood frame may be lacquered, and pricier tsuitate may be very richly decorated, including use of precious metals.  

Apart from their use as works of art, they are often used to screen entrances, and block wind and sun They may also partition rooms, divide the public part of a shop from the residential area behind, and act as a signboard.

Furnishings
Japanese traditions
Japanese woodwork
Japanese words and phrases
Partitions in traditional Japanese architecture
Portable furniture

References